The 2018 Argentina Open was a men's tennis tournament played on outdoor clay courts. It was the 21st edition of the ATP Buenos Aires event, and part of the ATP World Tour 250 series of the 2018 ATP World Tour. It took place in Buenos Aires, Argentina, from February 12 through 18, 2018.

Points and prize money

Point distribution

Prize money

Singles main-draw entrants

Seeds 

 1 Rankings are as of February 5, 2018.

Other entrants 
The following players received wildcards into the singles main draw:
  Carlos Berlocq 
  Pedro Cachín 
  Nicolás Kicker

The following players received entry as special exempts:
  Roberto Carballés Baena
  Thiago Monteiro

The following players received entry using a protected ranking:
  Andreas Haider-Maurer

The following players received entry from the qualifying draw:
  Facundo Bagnis 
  Thomaz Bellucci 
  Marco Cecchinato 
  Rogério Dutra Silva

Withdrawals 
Before the tournament
  Marin Čilić → replaced by  Guillermo García López
  Alexandr Dolgopolov → replaced by  Florian Mayer
  Kyle Edmund → replaced by  Gastão Elias
  Paolo Lorenzi → replaced by  Dušan Lajović

Doubles main-draw entrants

Seeds 

 1 Rankings are as of February 5, 2018.

Other entrants 
The following pairs received wildcards into the doubles main draw:
  Dorian Descloix /  Gaël Monfils 
  Guillermo Durán /  Máximo González

Withdrawals 
During the tournament
  Pablo Carreño Busta

Finals

Singles 

  Dominic Thiem defeated  Aljaž Bedene, 6–2, 6–4

Doubles 

  Andrés Molteni /  Horacio Zeballos defeated  Juan Sebastián Cabal /  Robert Farah, 6–3, 5–7, [10–3]

References

External links 

 

Argentina Open
Argentina Open
Argentina Open
ATP Buenos Aires